Ojigi may refer to:

Bowing in Japan
Ojigi (Oyo), Yoruba king
Ojiji (born 1955), Canadian musician